Lisa-Marie Allen (born September 16, 1960 in Glendale, California) is an American former figure skater. In 1979, she won gold at the inaugural Skate America (then titled Norton Skate). She is also the 1978 Skate Canada International champion, 1975 Nebelhorn Trophy champion, 1979 NHK Trophy Silver Medalist, and a four-time U.S. national medalist (three silver, one bronze). She competed at the 1980 Winter Olympics, placing fifth.

After retiring from amateur competition, Allen became the World Professional champion in 1990 and American Open Professional champion in 1997. She was the assistant choreographer for the feature film Blades of Glory (as well as making a cameo appearance) and assistant choreographer for the opening and closing ceremonies of the Salt Lake Olympic Games.

Results

References

External links
 
 Lisa-Marie Allen's entry at Figureskatingmystery.com

1960 births
American female single skaters
Olympic figure skaters of the United States
Figure skaters at the 1980 Winter Olympics
Living people
Sportspeople from Glendale, California
21st-century American women